The 1883 Pittsburgh Alleghenys season was the 2nd season of the Pittsburgh Alleghenys franchise. The Alleghenys finished seventh in the American Association with a record of 31–67.

Game log

|- style="background:#fbb;"
| 1 || Tuesday, May 1 || Philadelphia Athletics || 0–4 || 0–1
|- style="background:#fbb;"
| 2 || Wednesday, May 2 || Philadelphia Athletics || 1–8 || 0–2
|- style="background:#fbb;"
| 3 || Monday, May 7 || New York Metropolitans || 5–8 || 0–3
|- style="background:#fbb;"
| 4 || Tuesday, May 8 || New York Metropolitans || 7–10 || 0–4
|- style="background:#cfc;"
| 5 || Wednesday, May 9 || New York Metropolitans || 18–3 || 1–4
|- style="background:#fbb;"
| 6 || Thursday, May 10 || Baltimore Orioles || 3–4 || 1–5
|- style="background:#cfc;"
| 7 || Friday, May 11 || Baltimore Orioles || 7–6 || 2–5
|- style="background:#fbb;"
| 8 || Saturday, May 12 || Baltimore Orioles || 3–6 || 2–6
|- style="background:#fbb;"
| 9 || Tuesday, May 15 || @ New York Metropolitans || 2–6 || 2–7
|- style="background:#cfc;"
| 10 || Wednesday, May 16 || @ New York Metropolitans || 3–2 || 3–7
|- style="background:#fbb;"
| 11 || Thursday, May 17 || @ New York Metropolitans || 3–7 || 3–8
|- style="background:#fbb;"
| 12 || Saturday, May 19 || @ Philadelphia Athletics || 8–11 || 3–9
|- style="background:#fbb;"
| 13 || Monday, May 21 || @ Philadelphia Athletics || 1–4 || 3–10
|- style="background:#fbb;"
| 14 || Tuesday, May 22 || @ Philadelphia Athletics || 1–9 || 3–11
|- style="background:#cfc;"
| 15 || Thursday, May 24 || @ Baltimore Orioles || 16–4 || 4–11
|- style="background:#cfc;"
| 16 || Friday, May 25 || @ Baltimore Orioles || 15–6 || 5–11
|- style="background:#cfc;"
| 17 || Saturday, May 26 || @ Baltimore Orioles || 7–5 || 6–11
|- style="background:#fbb;"
| 18 || Tuesday, May 29 || St. Louis Browns || 5–10 || 6–12
|- style="background:#fbb;"
| 19 || Wednesday, May 30 || St. Louis Browns || 2–4 || 6–13
|- style="background:#cfc;"
| 20 || Wednesday, May 30 || St. Louis Browns || 10–4 || 7–13
|-

|- style="background:#cfc;"
| 21 || Saturday, Jun 2 || Cincinnati Red Stockings || 10–9 || 8–13
|- style="background:#fbb;"
| 22 || Monday, Jun 4 || Cincinnati Red Stockings || 8–12 || 8–14
|- style="background:#fbb;"
| 23 || Tuesday, Jun 5 || Cincinnati Red Stockings || 2–3 || 8–15
|- style="background:#cfc;"
| 24 || Thursday, Jun 7 || Louisville Eclipse || 10–0 || 9–15
|- style="background:#cfc;"
| 25 || Friday, Jun 8 || Louisville Eclipse || 18–6 || 10–15
|- style="background:#fbb;"
| 26 || Saturday, Jun 9 || Louisville Eclipse || 1–3 || 10–16
|- style="background:#fbb;"
| 27 || Tuesday, Jun 12 || Columbus Buckeyes || 5–6 || 10–17
|- style="background:#fbb;"
| 28 || Thursday, Jun 14 || Columbus Buckeyes || 10–23 || 10–18
|- style="background:#fbb;"
| 29 || Friday, Jun 15 || Columbus Buckeyes || 8–11 || 10–19
|- style="background:#cfc;"
| 30 || Monday, Jun 18 || @ Columbus Buckeyes || 5–4 || 11–19
|- style="background:#fbb;"
| 31 || Tuesday, Jun 19 || @ Columbus Buckeyes || 2–5 || 11–20
|- style="background:#cfc;"
| 32 || Wednesday, Jun 20 || @ Columbus Buckeyes || 11–4 || 12–20
|- style="background:#fbb;"
| 33 || Friday, Jun 22 || @ Columbus Buckeyes || 8–10 || 12–21
|- style="background:#fbb;"
| 34 || Saturday, Jun 23 || @ Cincinnati Red Stockings || 2–7 || 12–22
|- style="background:#cfc;"
| 35 || Monday, Jun 25 || @ Cincinnati Red Stockings || 2–1 || 13–22
|- style="background:#cfc;"
| 36 || Tuesday, Jun 26 || @ Cincinnati Red Stockings || 4–1 || 14–22
|- style="background:#fbb;"
| 37 || Thursday, Jun 28 || @ Louisville Eclipse || 4–9 || 14–23
|- style="background:#fbb;"
| 38 || Saturday, Jun 30 || @ Louisville Eclipse || 7–8 || 14–24
|-

|- style="background:#fbb;"
| 39 || Sunday, Jul 1 || @ Louisville Eclipse || 0–14 || 14–25
|- style="background:#fbb;"
| 40 || Monday, Jul 2 || @ Louisville Eclipse || 4–10 || 14–26
|- style="background:#fbb;"
| 41 || Wednesday, Jul 4 || @ St. Louis Browns || 2–8 || 14–27
|- style="background:#fbb;"
| 42 || Wednesday, Jul 4 || @ St. Louis Browns || 2–3 || 14–28
|- style="background:#fbb;"
| 43 || Friday, Jul 6 || @ St. Louis Browns || 1–4 || 14–29
|- style="background:#fbb;"
| 44 || Sunday, Jul 8 || @ St. Louis Browns || 2–5 || 14–30
|- style="background:#cfc;"
| 45 || Tuesday, Jul 10 || Philadelphia Athletics || 11–4 || 15–30
|- style="background:#fbb;"
| 46 || Wednesday, Jul 11 || Philadelphia Athletics || 3–12 || 15–31
|- style="background:#cfc;"
| 47 || Thursday, Jul 12 || Philadelphia Athletics || 9–1 || 16–31
|- style="background:#fbb;"
| 48 || Friday, Jul 13 || Philadelphia Athletics || 1–4 || 16–32
|- style="background:#fbb;"
| 49 || Saturday, Jul 14 || Philadelphia Athletics || 2–3 || 16–33
|- style="background:#cfc;"
| 50 || Tuesday, Jul 17 || New York Metropolitans || 7–6 || 17–33
|- style="background:#fbb;"
| 51 || Wednesday, Jul 18 || New York Metropolitans || 1–9 || 17–34
|- style="background:#cfc;"
| 52 || Thursday, Jul 19 || New York Metropolitans || 6–1 || 18–34
|- style="background:#fbb;"
| 53 || Friday, Jul 20 || New York Metropolitans || 9–10 || 18–35
|- style="background:#cfc;"
| 54 || Monday, Jul 23 || @ Baltimore Orioles || 12–4 || 19–35
|- style="background:#fbb;"
| 55 || Wednesday, Jul 25 || @ Baltimore Orioles || 9–13 || 19–36
|- style="background:#cfc;"
| 56 || Thursday, Jul 26 || @ Baltimore Orioles || 11–8 || 20–36
|- style="background:#fbb;"
| 57 || Friday, Jul 27 || @ Baltimore Orioles || 8–21 || 20–37
|- style="background:#fbb;"
| 58 || Saturday, Jul 28 || @ Philadelphia Athletics || 2–11 || 20–38
|- style="background:#fbb;"
| 59 || Monday, Jul 30 || @ Philadelphia Athletics || 4–17 || 20–39
|- style="background:#fbb;"
| 60 || Tuesday, Jul 31 || @ Philadelphia Athletics || 12–16 || 20–40
|-

|- style="background:#fbb;"
| 61 || Wednesday, Aug 1 || @ Philadelphia Athletics || 2–19 || 20–41
|- style="background:#cfc;"
| 62 || Friday, Aug 3 || @ New York Metropolitans || 4–3 || 21–41
|- style="background:#fbb;"
| 63 || Saturday, Aug 4 || @ New York Metropolitans || 6–7 || 21–42
|- style="background:#fbb;"
| 64 || Monday, Aug 6 || @ New York Metropolitans || 3–7 || 21–43
|- style="background:#fbb;"
| 65 || Tuesday, Aug 7 || @ New York Metropolitans || 1–16 || 21–44
|- style="background:#cfc;"
| 66 || Thursday, Aug 9 || Baltimore Orioles || 4–2 || 22–44
|- style="background:#cfc;"
| 67 || Friday, Aug 10 || Baltimore Orioles || 5–4 || 23–44
|- style="background:#cfc;"
| 68 || Saturday, Aug 11 || Baltimore Orioles || 6–4 || 24–44
|- style="background:#fbb;"
| 69 || Monday, Aug 13 || Baltimore Orioles || 3–11 || 24–45
|- style="background:#fbb;"
| 70 || Thursday, Aug 16 || Louisville Eclipse || 1–5 || 24–46
|- style="background:#fbb;"
| 71 || Friday, Aug 17 || Louisville Eclipse || 9–11 || 24–47
|- style="background:#fbb;"
| 72 || Saturday, Aug 18 || Louisville Eclipse || 1–7 || 24–48
|- style="background:#fbb;"
| 73 || Monday, Aug 20 || Louisville Eclipse || 2–8 || 24–49
|- style="background:#fbb;"
| 74 || Wednesday, Aug 22 || St. Louis Browns || 3–6 || 24–50
|- style="background:#fbb;"
| 75 || Thursday, Aug 23 || St. Louis Browns || 7–10 || 24–51
|- style="background:#fbb;"
| 76 || Friday, Aug 24 || St. Louis Browns || 4–15 || 24–52
|- style="background:#cfc;"
| 77 || Saturday, Aug 25 || St. Louis Browns || 7–3 || 25–52
|- style="background:#fbb;"
| 78 || Tuesday, Aug 28 || Columbus Buckeyes || 0–4 || 25–53
|- style="background:#fbb;"
| 79 || Wednesday, Aug 29 || Columbus Buckeyes || 6–10 || 25–54
|- style="background:#cfc;"
| 80 || Thursday, Aug 30 || Columbus Buckeyes || 14–4 || 26–54
|- style="background:#fbb;"
| 81 || Friday, Aug 31 || Columbus Buckeyes || 0–2 || 26–55
|-

|- style="background:#cfc;"
| 82 || Monday, Sep 3 || Cincinnati Red Stockings || 4–3 || 27–55
|- style="background:#fbb;"
| 83 || Tuesday, Sep 4 || Cincinnati Red Stockings || 7–9 || 27–56
|- style="background:#cfc;"
| 84 || Wednesday, Sep 5 || Cincinnati Red Stockings || 15–9 || 28–56
|- style="background:#cfc;"
| 85 || Thursday, Sep 6 || Cincinnati Red Stockings || 12–4 || 29–56
|- style="background:#fbb;"
| 86 || Monday, Sep 10 || @ Cincinnati Red Stockings || 6–12 || 29–57
|- style="background:#fbb;"
| 87 || Tuesday, Sep 11 || @ Cincinnati Red Stockings || 2–7 || 29–58
|- style="background:#fbb;"
| 88 || Wednesday, Sep 12 || @ Cincinnati Red Stockings || 5–27 || 29–59
|- style="background:#fbb;"
| 89 || Thursday, Sep 13 || @ Cincinnati Red Stockings || 2–8 || 29–60
|- style="background:#cfc;"
| 90 || Saturday, Sep 15 || @ Columbus Buckeyes || 7–3 || 30–60
|- style="background:#fbb;"
| 91 || Sunday, Sep 16 || @ Columbus Buckeyes || 1–5 || 30–61
|- style="background:#fbb;"
| 92 || Wednesday, Sep 19 || @ Columbus Buckeyes || 3–8 || 30–62
|- style="background:#cfc;"
| 93 || Friday, Sep 21 || @ Louisville Eclipse || 7–5 || 31–62
|- style="background:#fbb;"
| 94 || Saturday, Sep 22 || @ Louisville Eclipse || 4–5 || 31–63
|- style="background:#fbb;"
| 95 || Sunday, Sep 23 || @ Louisville Eclipse || 0–4 || 31–64
|- style="background:#fbb;"
| 96 || Wednesday, Sep 26 || @ St. Louis Browns || 3–20 || 31–65
|- style="background:#fbb;"
| 97 || Thursday, Sep 27 || @ St. Louis Browns || 2–6 || 31–66
|- style="background:#fbb;"
| 98 || Sunday, Sep 30 || @ St. Louis Browns || 3–6 || 31–67
|-

|- style="text-align:center;"
| Legend:       = Win       = Loss

Season standings

 Record vs. opponents 

Roster

 Player stats 
BattersNote: G = Games played; AB = At bats; H = Hits; Avg. = Batting average; HR = Home runs; RBI = Runs batted inPitchers Note: G = Games pitched; IP = Innings pitched; W = Wins; L = Losses; ERA = Earned run average; SO = Strikeouts''

References

Pittsburgh Pirates seasons
Pittsburgh Alleghenys season
Pittsburg Pir